The ARIA Albums Chart ranks the best-performing albums and extended plays (EPs) in Australia. Its data, published by the Australian Recording Industry Association, is based collectively on the weekly physical and digital sales of albums and EPs. In 2020, 39 albums claimed the top spot; Harry Styles' Fine Line returned to number one on the first chart of the year after spending one week atop the chart in December 2019. Eleven acts, Selena Gomez, Lil Uzi Vert, Dua Lipa, The Smith Street Band, The Teskey Brothers, Vika and Linda, Pop Smoke, Lime Cordiale, Juice Wrld, Joji and Adam Lambert, achieved their first number-one album.

Chart history

Number-one artists

See also
2020 in music
List of number-one singles of 2020 (Australia)
List of top 10 albums in 2020 (Australia)

References

2020
Australia albums
Number-one albums